Inspector Gadget Saves Christmas is a Christmas television special, featuring characters from the animated series Inspector Gadget. The special was produced by DIC Animation City and aired on NBC on December 4, 1992.

Synopsis 
The special opens up at the North Pole, where Santa Claus and his elves are working on all the toys that Santa will deliver at Christmas. Doctor Claw has managed to sneak into the factory and disguise himself as Santa. He has also managed to install mind-control devices on all the elves, which he then activates, and orders them to capture Santa. His plan is to use the mind-controlled elves to make defective toys, for which the world will blame Santa. Meanwhile, he orders his MAD agents to destroy Gadget. Several attempts are made in the opening credits, all of which fail.

Meanwhile, Gadget has been going around with his Christmas doings, completely oblivious to the MAD agents attempting to do him in. Later, he visits the local mall Santa, actually Chief Quimby in disguise. The Chief gives Gadget a self-destructing note containing his mission (and of course, Gadget leaves it to blow up in the Chief's face).

Gadget, along with Penny and Brain, heads off to the North Pole, taking with him the assumption that Doctor Claw has not made his move yet. Upon entering the factory, Gadget firmly believes there is nothing wrong. He does not even get suspicious when he is staring the Santa-disguised Doctor Claw right in the face. Penny and Brain, on the other hand, are not so easily fooled. But when they try to tell Gadget about it, he is sideswiped by a claw from the factory and thrown onto the conveyor belt with all the bad toys the elves are manufacturing where Gadget sings a parody of "The Twelve Days of Christmas" using the things he winds up crashing into. When this does not finish him off (thanks to Brain's meddling), Claw instead has Gadget dropped down the manhole he dropped Santa through at the beginning. There, Gadget comes upon the real Santa Claus, but arrests him, thinking this Santa is the fraud.

Meanwhile, Penny is snooping around the whole factory and hides in a giant jack-in-the-box. Penny sees the elves destroying the toys. Penny calls Brain to tell him that Doctor Claw plans to ruin Christmas. Brain then reports that the elves tried to eliminate Gadget, he found the real Santa and accused him of being Doctor Claw. However, the elves find Penny and trap her in the jack-in-the-box. Penny calls Brain to tell him that she will escape somehow and he has to save Gadget.

Brain manages to snatch the keys away from Doctor Claw and open the cell where Gadget has been interrogating "the fake Santa" using lines of The Night Before Christmas for reference. Gadget mistakes Brain for "the fake Santa's" accomplice, lassos the both of them and heads off to tell "the real Santa" he has caught the criminals. Meanwhile, Penny uses her computer book to find out how the elves are being mind controlled. Penny manages to escape and she finds herself in a place where Doctor Claw hidden Santa's real toys.

As Gadget helps "Santa" load the broken toys onto the sleigh, Brain springs himself and the real Santa loose, and then follows Penny to the control room that Doctor Claw has left vacant. Penny immediately deactivates the mind control on the elves, but Doctor Claw quickly gets into his jet and prepares to take off with the sleigh full of broken toys. But the real Santa shows up with his reindeer and foils him by unhooking the sleigh from the MAD Jet. Then for good measure, Gadget, still not realizing he has been helping his nemesis the whole time, ties the hook to a candy cane prop. Then the reindeer break up the ice behind the MAD Jet, sending him drifting into the distance. After the Chief makes his obligatory appearance to congratulate Gadget and company for saving Christmas, Santa gives them a ride in his sleigh.

Voice cast 
 Don Adams - Inspector Gadget (speaking voice)
 Frank Welker - Brain, Doctor Claw, MAD Cat, Santa Claus
 Maurice LaMarche - Chief Quimby, Inspector Gadget (singing voice)
 Erica Horn - Penny

Home Media Releases 
The special was first released on VHS in 1993 by Buena Vista Home Video. The VHS was re-released on October 16, 2001 by Lions Gate Home Entertainment and Trimark Home Video through the DIC Home Entertainment label.

The special was released on DVD for the first time by Sterling Entertainment in 2004. Three episodes of the original Inspector Gadget series, "The Weather in Tibet", "So It is Written" and "Birds of a Feather" were also included. The special was re-released on DVD again by New Video/Cinedigm in 2013 without the bonus episodes.

See also 
 Inspector Gadget (animated series)
 Inspector Gadget spinoff incarnations

References

External links
 

Inspector Gadget
1990s animated television specials
NBC television specials
Christmas television specials
1992 television specials
1992 in American television
Television series by DIC Entertainment
American Christmas television specials
Animated Christmas television specials
Santa Claus in television